Oleg Zhegoyev is a Soviet sprint canoer who competed in the early 1970s. He won a gold medal in the K-1 4 x 500 m event at the 1973 ICF Canoe Sprint World Championships in Tampere.

References

Living people
Soviet male canoeists
Year of birth missing (living people)
Russian male canoeists
ICF Canoe Sprint World Championships medalists in kayak